Plutonium-242 (242Pu or Pu-242) is one of the isotopes of plutonium, the second longest-lived, with a half-life of 375,000 years.
The half-life of 242Pu is about 15 times that of 239Pu; so it is one-fifteenth as radioactive, and not one of the larger contributors to nuclear waste radioactivity.
242Pu's gamma ray emissions are also weaker than those of the other isotopes.

It is not fissile (but it is fissionable by fast neutrons) and its neutron capture cross section is also low.

In the nuclear fuel cycle

Plutonium-242 is produced by successive neutron capture on 239Pu, 240Pu, and 241Pu. The odd-mass isotopes 239Pu and 241Pu have about a 3/4 chance of undergoing fission on capture of a thermal neutron and about a 1/4 chance of retaining the neutron and becoming the following isotope. The proportion of 242Pu is low at low burnup but increases nonlinearly.

Plutonium-242 has a particularly low cross section for thermal neutron capture; and it takes three neutron absorptions to become another fissile isotope (either curium-245 or plutonium-241) and then one more neutron to undergo fission. Even then, there is a chance either of those two fissile isotopes will absorb the fourth neutron instead of fissioning, becoming curium-246 (on the way to even heavier actinides like californium, which is a neutron emitter by spontaneous fission and difficult to handle) or becoming 242Pu again, so the mean number of neutrons absorbed until fission is even higher than 4. Therefore, 242Pu is particularly unsuited to recycling in a thermal reactor and would be better used in a fast reactor where it can be fissioned directly. However, 242Pu's low cross section means that relatively little of it will be transmuted during one cycle in a thermal reactor.

Decay
Plutonium-242 mainly decays into uranium-238 via alpha decay, before continuing along the uranium series. Plutonium-242 decays via spontaneous fission in about 5.5 × 10−4% of cases

References

Actinides
Nuclear materials
Isotopes of plutonium